Buzz Airways was a virtual passenger airline that commenced operations on June 12, 2014, out of Branson Airport in Branson, Missouri, United States. Flights were operated as public charters operated by Corporate Flight Management utilizing Jetstream 41 aircraft.

Corporate Flight Management previously operated service to Branson under the Branson Air Express banner.

Buzz Airways service resumed on May 8, 2015, to Austin and Chicago from Branson.

Buzz Airways' 2016 slate of service from Branson was to Austin and New Orleans, and began May 27, 2016.

The Buzz Airways service has now ended.

Former destinations

Austin, Texas - Austin–Bergstrom International Airport 
Branson, Missouri - Branson Airport
Chicago, Illinois - Midway International Airport
New Orleans, Louisiana - Louis Armstrong New Orleans International Airport

Fleet
Buzz Airways fleet as of April 2015:

References

External links
Official website

Defunct airlines of the United States
Airlines based in Missouri
Airlines established in 2014
2014 establishments in Missouri
Airlines disestablished in 2017
2017 disestablishments in Missouri